is a Japanese professional baseball player for the Tohoku Rakuten Golden Eagles in Japan's Nippon Professional Baseball.

Imae won the Most Valuable Player award in both the 2005 and 2010 Japan Series.

He selected .

References

External links

NPB.com

1983 births
2006 World Baseball Classic players
Chiba Lotte Marines players
Japanese baseball players
Living people
Nippon Professional Baseball third basemen
Baseball people from Kyoto Prefecture
Tohoku Rakuten Golden Eagles players
Japanese baseball coaches
Nippon Professional Baseball coaches